Paulo Rogério Reis Silva (born April 10, 1984, in São Paulo), nicknamed Somália, is a Brazilian footballer, who can play in both defensive midfielder and left wingback. He currently plays for Água Santa.

Career
Silva started his football career playing for small São Paulo-based clubs. Joining Bragantino in 2007, he became noted for his shooting ability. Despite his club's poor form, Silva managed to attract the attention of Botafogo, signing a contract with the club in 2010. His good performances and versatility earned him a five-year contract with the Série A club. He has played all across the pitch for Botafogo.

Personal life

Fake kidnapping
On January 7, 2011, Silva claimed he had been kidnapped at gunpoint before being robbed of money and jewelry. CCTV footage showed that he was simply late for training, and fabricated the story in order to circumvent the clubs 40% wage drop due to tardiness. Silva was charged with filing a false police report, and on January 19, 2011, he agreed to a deal offered by prosecutors to donate R$22,000 (about US$13,000) to the victims of recent floods in the state of Rio de Janeiro, in order to avoid a possible prison sentence and criminal record.

Honors
Bragantino
Campeonato Brasileiro Série C: 2007

Botafogo
 Campeonato Carioca: 2010

CRB
 Campeonato Alagoano: 2016

References

External links
 www.ogol.com.br
 

Living people
Brazilian footballers
1984 births
Campeonato Brasileiro Série A players
Campeonato Brasileiro Série B players
Associação Atlética Francana players
Clube Atlético Bragantino players
América Futebol Clube (RN) players
Botafogo de Futebol e Regatas players
Associação Atlética Ponte Preta players
Joinville Esporte Clube players
ABC Futebol Clube players
Clube de Regatas Brasil players
Association football midfielders
Association football defenders
Footballers from São Paulo